Clapp Ridge is a narrow, steep-sided ridge about  long, forming the north wall of Hand Glacier in the Victory Mountains, Victoria Land. It was mapped by the United States Geological Survey from surveys and from U.S. Navy air photos, 1960–64, and named by the Advisory Committee on Antarctic Names for James L. Clapp, a member of the United States Antarctic Research Program glaciological party to Roosevelt Island, 1967–68.

References 

Ridges of Victoria Land
Borchgrevink Coast